Woops! is an American postapocalyptic sitcom that aired on the Fox network from September 27 to December 6, 1992. The series was created by Gary Jacobs, and produced by Witt/Thomas Productions in association with Touchstone Television.

Synopsis
The series centered around the six survivors of a world nuclear holocaust. They live together in an abandoned farm house while trying to survive and re-establish civilization. Thirteen episodes were made, but only 10 were aired before Fox cancelled the series. In July 2002, TV Guide named Woops! the 42nd-worst TV show of all time, and referred to as a "post-apocalyptic Gilligan's Island".

Characters
 Mark Braddock (Evan Handler), formerly a schoolteacher, is the narrator of the show by writing in his journal. The pilot episode focuses on Mark, showing him finishing his classes and making a deposit at a drive-up window at the bank when a flash of light (the nuclear attack) occurs, and everything is turned to ruins except for Mark and his automobile, which was a Volvo. (The joke being that Volvos have a reputation for being well-built, reliable, and safe cars.)
 Jack Connors (Fred Applegate), formerly a homeless man and a great practical joker, revealed he survived the nuclear war because he was sleeping under an expressway overpass, whose structure protected him. Jack considered his finding the farm advantageous, as he is no longer homeless.
 Alice McConnell (Meagen Fay) was a progressive feminist stereotype. She reveals she worked in an old bookstore that had been built in the 1960s and equipped with a fallout shelter, which was converted into the basement. She ran out of register tape and went to the basement to get a fresh roll, thus being spared when the attack occurred.
 Frederick Ross (Cleavant Derricks) was formerly a research biologist. His excellent knowledge of science is vital to the survival of the community. Although he considered it ironic that he was possibly the only Black man to have survived the nuclear war, and occasionally mused over the possible loss of a Black female companion, he genuinely enjoyed his White friends and living on the farm.
 Suzanne Skillman (Marita Geraghty), a hair salon employee, ia a dumb blonde stereotype, although her hair color was clearly brunette.
 Curtis Thorpe (Lane Davies) was formerly an aggressive venture capitalist. He finds adjusting to farm life difficult, as most of the business skills he had before are not needed on the farm, although he was surprisingly athletic, having participated in track and field at Harvard.

Episodes

See also
Whoops Apocalypse, a 1982 television sitcom that aired on ITV detailing the weeks leading up to the apocalypse
The Last Man on Earth, a 2015 postapocalyptic comedy that also aired on Fox, but with greater success

References

External links
 

1992 American television series debuts
1992 American television series endings
1990s American sitcoms
English-language television shows
Fox Broadcasting Company original programming
Television series by ABC Studios
Post-apocalyptic television series
Television shows set in Los Angeles